This is a list of mathematical topics in relativity, by Wikipedia page.

Special relativity

Foundational issues
principle of relativity
speed of light
faster-than-light
biquaternion
conjugate diameters
four-vector
four-acceleration
four-force
four-gradient
four-momentum
four-velocity
hyperbolic orthogonality
hyperboloid model
light-like
Lorentz covariance
Lorentz group
Lorentz transformation
Lorentz–FitzGerald contraction hypothesis
Minkowski diagram
Minkowski space
Poincaré group
proper length
proper time
rapidity
relativistic wave equations
relativistic mass
split-complex number
unit hyperbola
world line

General relativity

black holes
no-hair theorem
Hawking radiation
Hawking temperature
Black hole entropy
charged black hole
rotating black hole
micro black hole
Schwarzschild black hole
Schwarzschild metric
Schwarzschild radius
Reissner–Nordström black hole
Immirzi parameter
closed timelike curve
cosmic censorship hypothesis
chronology protection conjecture
Einstein–Cartan theory 
Einstein's field equation
geodesic
gravitational redshift
Penrose–Hawking singularity theorems
Pseudo-Riemannian manifold
stress–energy tensor
worm hole

Cosmology

anti-de Sitter space
Ashtekar variables
Batalin–Vilkovisky formalism
Big Bang
Cauchy horizon
cosmic inflation
cosmic microwave background
cosmic variance
cosmological constant
dark energy
dark matter
de Sitter space
Friedmann–Lemaître–Robertson–Walker metric
horizon problem
large-scale structure of the cosmos
Randall–Sundrum model
warped geometry
Weyl curvature hypothesis

Relativity
Mathematics